Saandesh B. Nayak (born 21 May 1975) is a Bollywood film director who has directed 2016 release Love Shagun. His next film Zeenat stars Mallika Sherawat.  He is also known as a Grooming Director for multiple TV shows like Comedy Ka Maha Muqabla on Star Plus, Chhote Miya on Colors and Entertainment Ke Liye Kuch Bhi Karega on Sony.

Early life

Saandesh B. Nayak was born in Hoshangabad, a small town in Madhya Pradesh and was brought up in Bhopal, M.P. He studied in Bhartiya Vidhya Mandir School and then did his secondary education from Model School, Bhopal. A commerce graduate from B.H.E.L. College, he started his business career as a cable operator. His first tryst with the acting world began in 1987 when he joined Jawahar Bal Bhavan Theatre. He also participated in National School of Drama Workshop in Bharat Bhavan, Bhopal.

Career
It was in the year 1996 that he came to Mumbai. He did theatre with Mr. Mukesh Jadhav. He also joined Madhumati Acting Academy. Saandesh B. Nayak has worked as an actor in feature films like Josh, Say Salaam India and Maximum,. He has worked in multiple TV shows like Aahat, CID, Dhadkan, Crime Patrol and Siski on Sony Channel, Sath Nibhana Saathiya on Star Plus, X Zone and Rishtey on Zee Television, Fultu Pagal Hai on Zee Smiles, Rocky Ala Re Ala (with Chunky Pandey), Draupadi on Sahara TV, Kairi-Rishta Khatta Meetha on Colours TV, Aap beeti, Hum Hain Na, Prakriti, Talaq Kyu on DD National. He has also done several comedy shows in more than three hundred different looks. These comedy shows include JBC on Aaj Tak with Mr. Javed Jaffery, NNN with the veteran actor Mr. Kadar Khan, Milte Hain Break Ke Baad, Khauf, Gupshup Coffee Shop, Chintu Chinky, Tota weds Maina on SAB TV and various roles for CItyBuzz Channel. He was also a freelance anchor for All India Radio, Mumbai. He is currently on the panel of Creative Directors for National Film Development Corporation of India.
 
Saandesh B. Nayak established Saanvi Nayak Films in the year 2014. Later on, he also went on to start an NGO - Saanvi Social Welfare Organization. He is also one of the founders of the Web TV channel - Bumper clap online. Under the banner of Saanvi Nayak Films, Saandesh B. Nayak directed his debut film Love Shagun. starring Anuj Sachdeva, Nidhi Subbaiah, Vikram Kochhar, Manit Joura, Taran Bajaj, Shamin Mannan and Simpy Singh. Love Shagun is a romantic comedy about seven different definitions of love where the definitions are the characters themselves. This film encompasses the menial insecurities of today's youth and different emotional scenarios.
 
His second directorial venture, Zeenat, features Mallika Sherawat. It is in the pre-production stages and is scheduled to release by the end of 2017. It also touches upon human relationships.

Filmography

References

External links 

1975 births
Living people
Indian male screenwriters
Hindi-language film directors
21st-century Indian film directors
Film directors from Madhya Pradesh
People from Bhopal district